Legacy Village is a lifestyle center in Lyndhurst, Ohio. Owned by First Interstate Properties Ltd and designed by Dorsky Hodgson Partners of Cleveland, it opened on October 24, 2003. Located at the intersection of Cedar and Richmond Roads, it stands on a portion of the former TRW headquarters property, which was previously the Dudley S. Blossom estate. Beachwood Place is located diagonally across the street.

The center combines upscale dining, shopping, and entertainment. Upon its opening, 60% of its stores were new to Ohio. During the summer weekends, the complex hosts a series of outdoor concerts which it has dubbed Legacy Live.

Opening
Legacy Village was so popular on its first day that police officers were needed to direct traffic. While traffic became more normalized and regulated in the following months, the complex was built near an already busy intersection, and Legacy Village did not contain the amount of parking spaces required to by city law, even though Lyndhurst voters had already changed the laws for parking spaces specifically to benefit the complex. Parking meters were installed along the center section of the complex, and "parking tickets" that were not legally binding were issued to those parked at expired meters, which led to increased calls to the Lyndhurst police station.  Legacy Village officials stated that proceeds from parking tickets were donated to charity.

About a month after its opening, architecture critic Steven Litt complained in The Plain Dealer that Legacy Village was "a shopping center in the midst of a vast parking lot". He stated that the design, which sets some restaurants apart from the "village" mall area, created problems for foot traffic, and decried the center as a failed experiment in New Urbanism.

Despite the criticism, Legacy Village had an extremely successful first year, netting over $225 million and pulling shoppers to the area from far-away towns. The complex celebrated with a birthday cake and fireworks.

Anchor stores
Arhaus (flagship location)
Crate & Barrel
Dick's Sporting Goods
Ethan Allen
Giant Eagle
LA Fitness
L.L.Bean
Nordstrom Rack
Restoration Hardware

References

External links
Legacy Village
Cleveland.com Legacy Village news and features

Shopping malls in Cuyahoga County, Ohio
Shopping malls established in 2003
Lifestyle centers (retail)